A listing of lists of trees.

 List of individual trees, including actual and mythical trees
 List of largest giant sequoias
 List of old growth forests
 List of oldest trees
 List of superlative trees
List of superlative trees in Sweden
 List of tallest trees
 List of tree genera
 List of trees and shrubs by taxonomic family

Lists by location

 Africa
 Trees of Africa
 List of Southern African indigenous trees and woody lianes

 Americas
 Trees of Canada
 Trees of the Caribbean Basin
 Trees of North America

 Asia
 Trees of Iran
 Trees of Pakistan

 Australasia
 Trees of Australia
 List of trees native to New Zealand

 Europe
 List of trees of Great Britain and Ireland
 List of indigenous trees and shrubs of Lithuania
 List of superlative trees in Sweden

 
 
Forestry-related lists